The 2013 Seattle mayoral election took place on November 5, 2013, to elect the mayor of Seattle. Incumbent Mayor Michael McGinn ran for re-election to a second term in office.

Municipal elections in Washington are officially non-partisan. A non-partisan primary was held on August 6, 2013. The top two finishers, State Senator Ed Murray, who received 30% of the vote, and incumbent Mayor McGinn, who received 29% of the vote, advanced to the November general election.

Murray won the general election with 52% of the votes.

Primary election

Candidates

On the ballot
 Joey Gray, information-systems consultant and trainer
 Bruce Harrell, City Councilman (Democratic Party)
 Kate Martin, former Greenwood Community Council President
 Mary Martin, activist (Socialist Workers Party)
 Michael McGinn, incumbent Mayor (Democratic Party)
 Doug McQuaid, attorney
 Ed Murray, State Senator (Democratic Party)
 Charlie Staadecker, real estate broker
 Peter Steinbrueck, lobbyist and former City Councilman (Democratic Party)

Withdrew
 Tim Burgess, City Councilman (Democratic Party)
 David Ishii, "character"

Declined
 Sally J. Clark, City Council President (Democratic Party)
 Maud Daudon, President and CEO of the Seattle Metropolitan Chamber of Commerce
 Ron Sims, former Deputy Secretary of Housing and Urban Development and former King County Executive (Democratic Party)

Polling

Results

General election

Candidates
 Michael McGinn, incumbent Mayor
 Ed Murray, State Senator

Polling

Results

References

Mayoral elections in Seattle
Seattle
Mayor
Seattle mayoral
Seattle mayoral